Tom McGrath (born c. 1950) is an Irish-American ultra-runner. He has run over 200,000 miles to raise money for charities. Due to his 1977 run across America (which he did in a then-record 53 days) and other accolades, he has been nicknamed The Irish Forrest Gump.

Early life 
McGrath was born c. 1950 in Ederney, County Fermanagh, Northern Ireland. He played in two under-21 All-Ireland Finals in Gaelic football in 1970 and 1971; team came second both times.

Career 
In 1977, McGrath broke the world record for fastest crossing of the United States on foot – in 53 days and seven minutes. His record lasted for three years. For five consecutive years, he ran 1,000 miles around New York’s Central Park for charity. In May 1991, McGrath received the Jefferson award sponsored by Jacqueline Kennedy Onassis for representing New York State for Charity Services.

Since the 1990s, McGrath has owned and run The Black Sheep, a bar in midtown Manhattan. He carried the Olympic Torch as part of the 1996 Summer Olympics in Atlanta, Georgia.

In September 2016, McGrath published a memoir with author, Jared Beasley, titled The Black Sheep: The Fittest / Unfittest Bar Owner in New York.

Selected runs 
Below is a select list of the numerous charity and non-charity runs McGrath has completed.

References 

1950 births
Living people
Runners from Northern Ireland
Ultrarunning
Northern Ireland emigrants to the United States